Nikki & Sara Live is an American late night talk show hosted by comedians Nikki Glaser and Sara Schaefer. Glaser, Schaefer and Kim Gamble served as the show's executive producers. The series premiered on January 29, 2013, on the American cable television network MTV. Nikki & Sara Live was canceled on October 29, 2013.

Production
Brian McCann served as the show's head writer for most of the first season. Kim Gamble has served as showrunner for both the first and second season. Glaser and Schaefer have hosted a weekly podcast, "You Had to Be There," since January 2011. While Glaser and Schaefer were partaking in an interview on Katie Couric's talk show, Katie, Couric surprised the duo with the news about the series' second season renewal, with the second and final season premiering July 30, 2013.

Episodes

Season 1 (2013)

Season 2 (2013)

Reception
The series has received positive reviews. Anna Brand of The Daily Beast cited hosts Nikki Glaser and Sara Schaefer's "refreshing lack of diva behavior," "harmless sarcasm," and real-life "closeness" as crucial elements to the success of the show, which she deemed "late-night TV's best-kept secret." Jezebel writer Erin Gloria Ryan called the show "pretty great, like having a slumber party with the girls you thought you were never cool enough to be friends in high school with but who turn out to be super nice."

References

External links

2010s American late-night television series
2013 American television series debuts
2013 American television series endings
English-language television shows
MTV original programming